Paulo Dino Gazzaniga (born 2 January 1992) is an Argentine professional footballer who plays as a goalkeeper for Spanish La Liga club Girona, on loan from English Premier League club Fulham.

Early life
Gazzaniga was born in Murphy, Santa Fe, the same small town in Argentina where his future Southampton and Tottenham manager Mauricio Pochettino was also born. His father is Daniel Gazzaniga, a footballer, as is his brother Gianfranco who plays as a goalkeeper for Racing de Ferrol. Gazzaniga studied in the only public school and a secondary college in Murphy. He played for the football team of Centro Recreativo Unión y Cultura in Murphy as a goalkeeper.

Club career

Early career
In 2007, when he was 15, Gazzaniga left his hometown side Unión y Cultura with his brother and father for Spain, where he joined the Spanish club Valencia's youth setup. However, he failed to make a first team appearance for Los Che, and was subsequently released in May 2011.

In July 2011, Gazzaniga signed a two-year contract with League Two club Gillingham, to challenge Ross Flitney for the number one spot. Gazzaniga was recommended to Gillingham manager Andy Hessenthaler by Gary Penrice, Wigan Athletic's European scout, following his release from Valencia. He made his professional debut for the club on 4 October, in a 3–1 home defeat to Barnet in the Football League Trophy.

Southampton
On 20 July 2012, Gazzaniga signed a four-year deal with newly promoted Premier League side Southampton, with Tommy Forecast going to Gillingham on loan as part of the deal. He described it as "a crazy situation" but said it was like "a dream".

Gazzaniga made his debut on 28 August in a 4–1 victory against Stevenage in the second round of the League Cup. He made his league debut almost a month later, on 22 September in a 4–1 win against Aston Villa.

Gazzaniga was used as cover for first choice keepers Kelvin Davis, Artur Boruc and Fraser Forster, making only two appearances in 2014–15.

He made two Premier League appearances in the 2015–16 season, in the 1–0 defeat away to Crystal Palace and a home 2–0 defeat to Tottenham Hotspur, both in December 2015. He signed a new four-year deal with Southampton on 11 September 2015.

On 29 July 2016, Gazzaniga joined Segunda División club Rayo Vallecano on loan for the 2016–17 season.

Tottenham Hotspur
On 23 August 2017, Gazzaniga signed for fellow Premier League club Tottenham Hotspur on a five-year contract. He reunited with his compatriot and former Southampton manager, Mauricio Pochettino. He made his Premier League debut for the club on 5 November 2017, playing in a 1–0 victory against Crystal Palace. Pochettino said that Gazzaniga performed "fantastically well" on his debut.

In 2018–19 after starting for Tottenham in the Premier League against Brighton & Hove Albion and Huddersfield Town, in the EFL Cup against Watford and West Ham United and in the  UEFA Champions League home fixture against PSV, he earned his first Argentina national team call-up.  He became effectively the number two goalkeeper for Tottenham this season, having started in more games than Michel Vorm when Hugo Lloris was not available.

In the 2019–20 season, following Lloris' elbow injury in the opening ten minutes of a loss at Brighton & Hove Albion on 5 October 2019, Gazzaniga enjoyed an extended run as Spurs' first-choice goalkeeper.

On 1 February 2021, Gazzaniga joined Spanish side Elche on loan for the remainder of the 2020–21 season.

On 27 May 2021, Tottenham announced the departure of Gazzaniga at the end of the campaign following the conclusion of his contract.

Fulham
On 24 July 2021, Gazzaniga joined EFL Championship club Fulham on a two-year contract. Having been pushed to third choice keeper with the arrival of Bernd Leno in August 2022, Gazzaniga joined Girona on loan for the 2022–23 season.

International career
Gazzaniga made his first international appearance on 20 November 2018, coming off the bench to replace Gerónimo Rulli in the 59th minute in a friendly match against Mexico, and helped keep a clean sheet in a 2–0 win for Argentina.

Career statistics

Club

International

Honours
Southampton
U21 Premier League Cup: 2014–15

Tottenham Hotspur
UEFA Champions League runner-up: 2018–19

Fulham
EFL Championship: 2021–22

Individual
Gillingham Young Player of the Season: 2011–12

References

External links

1992 births
Living people
People from General López Department
Sportspeople from Santa Fe Province
Argentine footballers
Association football goalkeepers
Valencia CF players
Gillingham F.C. players
Southampton F.C. players
Rayo Vallecano players
Tottenham Hotspur F.C. players
Elche CF players
Fulham F.C. players
Girona FC players
English Football League players
Premier League players
Segunda División players
Argentina international footballers
Argentine expatriate footballers
Expatriate footballers in England
Expatriate footballers in Spain
Argentine expatriate sportspeople in Spain
Argentine expatriate sportspeople in England